Lalia is a Bantu language of the Democratic Republic of Congo.

References

Soko-Kele languages